Kiwassa Lake, originally called Lonesome Pond, is a 280-acre lake in the north-central Adirondack Park, south of Dewey Mountain, between Lower Saranac Lake and Oseetah Lake, two miles southwest of the village of Saranac Lake, New York, United States. It drains into Lake Oseetah, and thence into the Saranac River. The westernmost shore line is owned by New York State.

References

Adirondacks
Lakes of New York (state)
Lakes of Franklin County, New York
Tourist attractions in Franklin County, New York